Swanky Modes was a British fashion brand that opened in 1972 in London's Camden Town district. It consisted of four designers: Judy Dewsbury, Melanie Herberfield, Willie Walters and Esme Young, and was located at 193 Royal College Street, London. 

In the 1970s, they used form-fitting designs and their clients included Midge Ure, Cher and Grace Jones. They created the Amorphous Dress, which is now part of the V&A collection.  Swanky Modes also featured clothes in magazines and newspapers including Vogue, Nova, Honey, 19, ID, The Face, Boulevard, Interview, The Sunday Times, Express, Mail, and the V&A Little Black Dress Book.

References

Clothing brands of the United Kingdom